The Pelican South natural gas field is a hydrocarbons prospect located on the continental shelf of the Black Sea, in the Neptun deep perimeter, currently investigated by OMV Petrom and ExxonMobil. The spudding of the first exploration well started in October 2014. The Ocean Endeavour semi-submersible rig is used for the drilling of the well. The total proven reserves of the Pelican South gas field are estimated between 700 and 900 billion cubic feet and production is slated to be around 200 million cubic feet/day (5.65×106m³) in 2020.

References

Natural gas fields in Romania
Black Sea energy